Triple Divide Peak is located in the Lewis Range, part of the Rocky Mountains in North America. The peak is a feature of Glacier National Park in the state of Montana in the United States. The summit of the peak, the hydrological apex of the North American continent, is the point where two of the principal continental divides in North America converge, the Continental Divide of the Americas and the Northern or Laurentian Divide.

Hydrography
Water that falls at the summit can flow either to the Pacific, Atlantic, or Arctic oceans (when Hudson Bay is considered an Arctic tributary). The International Hydrographic Organization (in its current unapproved working edition only of Limits of Oceans and Seas) defines the Hudson Bay, with its outlet extending from 62.5 to 66.5 degrees north (just a few miles south of the Arctic Circle) as being part of the Arctic Ocean, specifically "Arctic Ocean Subdivision 9.11."

Discounting Antarctica and its ice sheets, only one other continent (Asia) borders three oceans, but the inward-draining endorheic basin area of Central Asia from western China to the Aral and Caspian Seas is so vast that any Arctic and Indian Ocean tributaries are never within proximity of each other.  Thus, North America's status of having a single location draining into three oceans is unique in the world. (However, some sources consider Hudson Bay to be part of the Atlantic, making Snow Dome – partially in Jasper National Park, on the border of the provinces of Alberta and British Columbia, Canada – to be the continent's sole hydrological apex.) 

Rainfall on the southwestern side of the peak enters Pacific Creek, which in turn enters Nyack Creek, the Middle Fork of the Flathead River, the Flathead River through Flathead Lake, the Clark Fork River into Pend Oreille Lake, the Pend Oreille River, and the Columbia River which empties into the Pacific near Astoria, Oregon.  

The northern slope of the mountain sheds water into Hudson Bay Creek, which then drains into Medicine Owl Creek and Red Eagle Creek.  It then empties into Saint Mary Lake, which feeds the St. Mary River, which in turn flows into the Oldman River, the South Saskatchewan River, the Saskatchewan River, and the Lake Winnipeg system, drained by the Nelson River which empties into Hudson Bay.  

Moisture on the southeastern slopes feeds into Atlantic Creek, which in turn enters the North Fork of Cut Bank Creek, Cut Bank Creek, the Marias River, and the Missouri River which joins the Mississippi River before emptying into the Atlantic's Gulf of Mexico near New Orleans.

Geology
The Lewis Range was formed in the Lewis Overthrust, some 59-75 million years ago, when an enormous slab of Precambrian rock faulted and slid over younger rocks from the Cretaceous period.

Gallery

See also

 List of mountains and mountain ranges of Glacier National Park (U.S.)

References

External links
 Climbing Triple Divide Peak

Mountains of Flathead County, Montana
Mountains of Glacier County, Montana
Mountains of Glacier National Park (U.S.)
Geology of the Rocky Mountains
Drainage divides
Great Divide of North America
Lewis Range
Mountains of Montana